Sudhamoy Babur Advut Galpo is a 2011 Indian film, which was directed by Anindya Chatterjee, and with music by Sanjib Sarkar.

Plot
Sudhamoy, the protagonist in the film has no-one in his family except his servant Khoma and a pocket watch which is an inherited possession. The daily life of Sudhamoy revolves around this watch. At one point of time, he becomes completely obsessed with this and he starts believing in the pocket watch solely. How this obsession changes his life is the central focus of the story. Moreover, the story is a glaring example of our lives becoming entirely mechanised.

Music and audio
The film's music, was done  by  award-winning composer Sanjib Sarkar.

References

External links
 

2011 films
Films shot in West Bengal
Indian thriller films
Indian nonlinear narrative films
Bengali-language Indian films
2010s Bengali-language films
2011 thriller films